German submarine U-490 was a Type XIV supply and replenishment U-boat ("Milchkuh") of Nazi Germany's Kriegsmarine during World War II.

Her keel was laid down on 21 February 1942, by Germaniawerft of Kiel as yard number 559. She was launched on 24 December 1942 and commissioned on 27 March 1943, with Leutnant zur See Wilhelm Gerlach in command. He remained in command throughout the boat's short career.

The U-boat's service life commenced with the 4th U-boat Flotilla from 27 March 1943 until 31 March 1944 for training. She then served, for operations, with the 12th flotilla.

Design
German Type XIV submarines were shortened versions of the Type IXDs they were based on. U-490 had a displacement of  when at the surface and  while submerged. She had two shafts and two propellers.

U-490 was not fitted with torpedo tubes or deck guns, but had two  SK C/30 anti-aircraft guns with 2500 rounds as well as a  C/30 guns with 3000 rounds. The boat had a complement of fifty-three.

Operational career
U-490s only patrol began with her departure from Kiel on 4 May 1944. She headed for the Atlantic by way of the so-called Faeroes Gap between Iceland and the Faeroe Islands, north of the British Isles.

There were 60 survivors (no casualties).

References

Bibliography

External links
 

German Type XIV submarines
U-boats commissioned in 1943
U-boats scuttled in 1943
World War II submarines of Germany
1942 ships
World War II shipwrecks in the Atlantic Ocean
Ships built in Kiel
Maritime incidents in June 1944